Universal Acceptance (UA) is a term coined by technologist Ram Mohan in 2001 to represent the principle that every top-level domain (TLD) should function within all applications regardless of script, number of characters, or how new it is.

Historically, there were a limited number of TLDs available in strings of two or three Latin-script characters. This began to change in 2000, when ICANN introduced new generic top-level domains (gTLDs) that were longer than three characters, such as .info and .museum. In 2010, the first internationalised domain names (IDNs), or domain names using non-Latin characters, were introduced. In 2013, ICANN's New gTLD Program introduced over 1,000 new gTLDs to its root. One issue surrounding the expansion of the Domain Name System’s Root Zone is the ability of Internet-based applications and systems to interact with these domain names. For the principles of Universal Acceptance to be realized, all valid domain names and email addresses must be accepted, validated, stored, processed and displayed correctly and consistently by all Internet-enabled applications, devices and systems.

Universal Acceptance Steering Group founding
In January 2015, Ram Mohan (then part of Afilias) convened a group of experts along with Cyrus Namazi (ex-ICANN) to discuss the proliferation of Universal Acceptance issues after the increase in the number of TLDs in the root. In February 2015, Mohan founded the Universal Acceptance Steering Group (UASG) at the ICANN52 meeting in Singapore. The first face to face meeting of the UASG was held at the ICANN53 meeting in Buenos Aires. The UASG has grown into a community-led program, supported by ICANN, aimed at facilitating the adoption of Universal Acceptance principles by the industry.

Mohan's Laws of Universal Acceptance 
In 2002, Ram Mohan, then CTO of the .INFO TLD, experienced the first instances of Universal Acceptance problems, and crafted three laws that appeared valid in the domain name space:

 An old TLD will be accepted more often than a new TLD.
 An ASCII-only TLD will be accepted more than an IDN TLD.
 A two or three letter TLD will be accepted more often than a longer ccTLD or gTLD.

As of 2019, these laws appear to still hold true. The success of Universal Acceptance will result in these laws becoming obsolete.

Universal Acceptance of popular web browsers
One of the primary ways of interfacing with the Internet is through web browsers. For this reason, the UASG commissioned a report on the performance of major browsers in the treatment and acceptance of 17 different domain names registered for the purpose of providing test cases for UA readiness.

The study found that desktop browsers generally performed well, but only Internet Explorer performed as expected. Common problems among the other browsers included the failure to properly render the URLs in the tab title bar and failing to treat an ideographic full stop as a delimiter. On mobile platforms, the results of the tests were much more varied, with the same browsers performing differently based on the operating system, with one of the most common problems being the proper display of Unicode URLs.

The study concluded that developers are making progress in making browsers UA Ready, but there is more work to do on every browser except Internet Explorer, a browser that has been discontinued.

Email address internalization 
Internationalized email address is also part of Universal Acceptance Steering Group, where Email Service providers are motivated to start providing email address for IDNs and also engage them to solve issues related to interoperability with legacy systems. Downgrading is not recommended using punycode however providing ASCII Alias email address with EAI is the recommended practice. Aliasing as downgrading technique is being practiced by BSNL, which used XgenPlus email solution.

Leadership at Universal Acceptance Steering Group
Leaders for UASG are chosen every two years by vote. In February 2015, Ram Mohan was elected chair, and Edmon Chung, Richard Merdinger and Mark Svancarek were elected vice chairs. In March 2019, Dr. Ajay Data was elected Chair and Dusan Stojicevic, Mark Svancarek and Dennis Tan Tanaka were elected vice chairs. In 2021 Dr. Ajay Data was again elected unopposed Chair of UASG along with Dr. U.B. Pavanaja and Abdalmonem Galila as vice chairs.

Working groups 
In 2019, UASG created working groups with community leaders and volunteers to better manage the groups works. 

 Technology Working Group 
 Email Address Internationalization
 Communications
 Measurement 
 Local Initiatives

UA Day 
In 2022, ICANN and the UASG  announced their intention to celebrate the UA Day, starting with the first one on 28 March 2023.

References

Domain Name System
Internationalized domain names